Pauline Stroud (21 March 1930 – 11 August 2022) was a British actress who was best known for her appearance in Lady Godiva Rides Again (1951).

Early life and career
An only child, Stroud was born in Tunbridge Wells, Kent, to Leslie Stroud, an accountant, and Daisy ( Waters). She initially attended a convent school – until her mother suspected that she was being considered as a possible recruit to the sisterhood. Thereafter she was educated privately, and her lessons included ballet and horse riding.

Stroud was selected nation-wide from 200 other women (some say 500 screen-tested) for her first role, given as 'honey-haired, blue-eyed and 5ft 4in tall'. She had been a dancing stand-in. She continued making movies until 1972.

Best known for her appearance in Lady Godiva Rides Again (1951), a film satire on beauty queens, Stroud was cast in the lead role over Audrey Hepburn, Diana Dors and Joan Collins.

Personal life and death
Stroud died from cancer on 11 August 2022, at the age of 92. Her death was reported on 4 September. Never married, she was survived by four cousins, Lynnette, Michael, Susan and Linda.

Filmography

References

External links
 
 
 

1930 births
2022 deaths
British actresses
People from Royal Tunbridge Wells